The Historical table of the Copa Libertadores is a cumulative record of all match results, points and goals of every team that has ever played in the Copa Libertadores since its inception in 1960, up to 2022 season.

The data below does not include the 1948 South American Championship of Champions, as it is not listed by Conmebol either as a Copa Libertadores edition or as an official competition. It must be pointed out, however, that at least in the years 1996 and 1997, Conmebol entitled equal status to both Copa Libertadores and the 1948 tournament, in that the 1948 champion club (CR Vasco da Gama) was allowed to participate in Supercopa Libertadores, a Conmebol official competition that allowed participation for former Libertadores champions only (for example, not admitting participation for champions of other Conmebol official competitions, such as Copa CONMEBOL).

Ranking 
From 1960 to 2022, 63 editions of the Copa Libertadores de América were held. During this period, the clubs rank in the competition is as follow (updated until 2021 Copa Libertadores Final):

Playing at 2022 edition.

Individual stats

By country 

Top 5 in each country

Updated until 2021 Copa Libertadores Final.

See also
Copa Libertadores records and statistics
List of Copa Libertadores finals
List of Copa Libertadores winning managers
List of Copa Libertadores winning players

References

Copa Libertadores
All-time football league tables